The football (soccer) Campeonato Brasileiro Série B 1998, the second level of Brazilian National League, was played from August 2 to December 20, 1998. The competition had 24 clubs and two of them were promoted to Série A and six were relegated to Série C. The competition was won by Gama.

Gama finished the final phase group with the most points, and was declared 1999 Brazilian Série B champions, claiming the promotion to the 1999 Série A along with Botafogo-SP, the runners-up. The six worst ranked teams in the first round (Fluminense, Atlético-GO, Náutico, Juventus, Volta Redonda and Americano) were relegated to play Série C in 1999.

Teams

First phase

Group A

Group B

Group C

Group D

Second phase

1 Londrina qualified after defeating ABC on a penalty shoot-out.

Third phase

Group 1

Group 2

Final phase

Final standings

Sources

Campeonato Brasileiro Série B seasons
1998 in Brazilian football leagues